The AACTA Award for Best Visual Effects or Animation (previously Best Visual Effects) is an award presented by the Australian Academy of Cinema and Television Arts (AACTA) for achievements in visual effects in film, television, documentary and short film. The award was first presented by the Australian Film Institute (AFI) at the Australian Film Institute Awards (known commonly as the AFI Awards) from 2006 to 2010, prior to the establishment of the Academy. In 2014 the award for Best Visual Effects was renamed Best Visual Effects or Animation. Additionally, this category is now open to any film, television or documentary production, regardless of geography, which has had 100% of its visual effects and animation made in Australia.

Winners and nominees
In the following table, winners are listed first, in boldface and highlighted in gold; those listed below the winner that are not in boldface or highlighted are the nominees.

See also
AACTA Awards

References

External links
The Australian Academy of Cinema and Television Arts Official website

Awards established in 2006
Visual Effects